OK to Go is the fifth album by rock band Virginia Coalition.  This was the first album after founding member Steve Dawson parted with the band.  The album contains re-vamped versions of Rock and Roll Party's "Come and Go" and "Walk to Work".

Track listing
 "Pick Your Poison" - 4:37
 "Last Goodbye" - 4:00
 "Walk to Work" - 3:57
 "Voyager II" - 5:11
 "Mason Dixon" - 4:46
 "Off the Air" - 5:20
 "Abby Are You Endless" - 3:17
 "Meteor" - 4:38
 "Come and Go" - 4:02
 "Bumpin' Fresh" - 4:02
 "Places People / No Diggity" - 9:47

References

2004 albums
Virginia Coalition albums